Seymour Horace Knox II (September 1, 1898 – September 27, 1990) was a Buffalo, New York, philanthropist and polo player. The son of wealthy businessman Seymour H. Knox, he owned a palatial home designed by C. P. H. Gilbert.

Early life
He was born on September 1, 1898 to Grace Millard Knox (1862–1936) and Seymour H. Knox I (1861–1915), who merged his chain of five-and-dime stores with those of his first cousins, Frank Winfield Woolworth and Charles Woolworth, to form the F. W. Woolworth Company in 1912. Knox was one of three surviving children born to Seymour and Grace. His elder sisters were Dorothy Virginia Knox and Marjorie Millard Knox.
Knox attended Nichols School in Buffalo and the Hotchkiss School in Connecticut. He was a 1920 graduate of Yale University.  At Yale he was a member of Delta Kappa Epsilon.

Career
In 1921, upon graduation from Yale, Knox became a Marine Midland Bank director. In 1926, he became vice-president, followed by chairman in 1943 until 1970. He joined the F. W. Woolworth board in 1926 and was chairman from 1943 until reaching the mandatory retirement age forty-five years later in 1971.  He became Chairman of The University at Buffalo's governing Council from 1950-69. Knox served on the board of directors of Marine Midland Bank, F. W. Woolworth Company, New York Central Railroad, Penn Central Railroad, and the American Steamship Company.

Art
In 1926, he joined the board of Albright Art Gallery. From the beginning, he was a leader in the modernism movement and in modern cultural life in Buffalo. He spent 60 years working with the Buffalo Fine Arts Academy and by 1939, he was President of the Academy.  He bolstered the Contemporary Abstractionism collection during his tenure.  He is best known for his 1962 addition to the Albright Art Gallery, designed by Skidmore, Owings & Merrill. After the completion of the addition, the Gallery was renamed the Albright-Knox Art Gallery Knox in his honor.  He donated more than 160 works for the new wing, and over 700 pieces over his lifetime.  He is said to be in part responsible for the popularity of Jackson Pollock.  Under his direction, the Gallery became the first museum to purchase a Clyfford Still, one of the first to purchase a Henry Moore, and as leading champions of Abstractionism, they acquired selections from almost every major abstractionist. In 1965 he was appointed to a commission to choose modern art works for the Governor Nelson A. Rockefeller Empire State Plaza Art Collection in Albany, NY.

Personal life

In 1923, he married Helen Northrup (1902-1971), who had attended the Albright Art School. They lived in a mansion at 57 Oakland Place in Buffalo, designed by C. P. H. Gilbert. Construction on the home began in 1924 and was a gift to the couple from Knox's mother, who lived nearby at 800 Delaware Avenue. Together, they had two sons:
Seymour H. Knox III (1926–1996)
Northrup Rand Knox (1928–1998)
Both sons were the original principal owners of the Buffalo Sabres NHL team. Knox was the subject of the 1985 Andy Warhol painting "Portrait of Seymour H. Knox".  He also donated significant funds to the Yale University Art Gallery, in New Haven, Connecticut, which both the Seymour H. Knox Jr., Curator of Modern and Contemporary Art and Seymour H. Knox Jr., Curator of European and Contemporary Art positions bear his name. He was an avid polo player and led his Aurora team to the United States Championship in 1932, later touring South America, and winning a tournament in Europe.

Knox died on September 27, 1990 and was eulogized in Congress by U.S. Representative Bill Paxon.

Honors
In 1986, he was awarded the National Medal of Arts by President Ronald Reagan for his contributions to the arts in Buffalo and the nation.

See also
Albright-Knox Art Gallery
Knox Farm State Park
National Medal of Arts

References

 Goldman, Mark, "City on The Edge: Buffalo, New York," Prometheus Books, 2007.

External links
 Sports Illustrated: School of Hard Knox
 Knox Family of Buffalo, NY
 Seymour H. Knox Is Dead at 92; Buffalo Banker Was Art Patron
 Friends of Knox Farm State Park

Philanthropists from New York (state)
1898 births
1990 deaths
Seymour H. 02
Leaders of the University at Buffalo
United States National Medal of Arts recipients
Businesspeople from Buffalo, New York
Albright–Knox Art Gallery
20th-century American businesspeople
20th-century American philanthropists